The Treaty of Passarowitz, or Treaty of Požarevac, was the peace treaty signed in Požarevac, a town that was in the Ottoman Empire but is now in Serbia, on 21 July 1718 between the Ottoman Empire and Austria of the Habsburg monarchy and the Republic of Venice.

The treaty saw the cession of several Ottoman territories to the Habsburgs, and it was regarded in its time as an extraordinary success and source of pride in Vienna.

Background
Between 1714 and 1718, the Ottomans had been successful against Venice in Ottoman Greece and Crete (Ottoman–Venetian War) but had been defeated at Petrovaradin (1716) by the Austrian troops of Prince Eugene of Savoy (Austro-Turkish War of 1716–1718).

Peace was arranged with the intervention of Great Britain and the Dutch Republic, and the treaty was signed by Sir Robert Sutton and  Jacob Colyer on behalf of their governments.
The other signatories were 
Damian Hugo, Count of Virmont and  Michael von Talmann for Austria, 
Vendramino Bianchi and Carlo Ruzzini for Venice 
Silindar Ibrahim–aga and Mehmed–efendija for the Ottoman Empire.

Terms
The Ottoman Empire lost the Banat of Temeswar, western Wallachia, northern Serbia (including the fortress town of Belgrade), and northern part of Bosnia, namely the region of Posavina to the Habsburgs. The Habsburgs also received assurances that their merchants could operate in the Ottoman domain and that Catholic priests would regain revoked privileges, which allowed the Habsburg emperor to interfere in Ottoman affairs through connections with the church community and by championing the Catholic faith.

Venice ceded the Morea, its last remaining outposts in Crete, and the islands of Aegina and Tinos. Venice retained only the Ionian Islands (with Ottoman-occupied Kythira added to them), and the cities of Preveza and Arta on the Epirote mainland. In Dalmatia, Venice made some small advances by taking the areas of Imotski and Vrgorac in the Hinterland.

Aftermath
The treaty gave the Habsburgs control over the northern part of present-day Serbia, which they had temporarily occupied during the Great Turkish War between 1688 and 1690. The Habsburgs established the Kingdom of Serbia as a crown land. The Habsburgs also formed the Banat into another crown land.

Austrian control lasted 21 years, when the Turks won the Austro-Russian–Turkish War (1735–39). In the 1739 Treaty of Belgrade, the Ottoman Empire regained northern Bosnia, Habsburg Serbia (including Belgrade) and southern parts of the Banat of Temeswar, and Oltenia was returned to Wallachia.

See also
 List of treaties

References

Sources

External links

 
 Text of treaty in English

Passarowitz
Požarevac
Ottoman Serbia
Serbia under Habsburg rule
History of Banat
History of Syrmia
Passarowitz
Passarowitz
History of Oltenia
Ottoman period in the history of Bosnia and Herzegovina
Passarowitz
Passarowitz
Passarowitz
Passarowitz
1718 in the Ottoman Empire
1718 in the Republic of Venice
1718 in the Habsburg monarchy
Austro-Turkish War (1716–1718)